Korong may refer to:
Shire of Korong, a former local government area in Victoria, Australia
Korong Vale, Victoria, a town within the Shire of Korong
Korong Vale railway station, a former railway station in the town
Electoral district of Korong, the state parliamentary electorate for the area
Korong Station, a pastoral lease in the Goldfields of Western Australia.
Mount Korong, the former name of the town of Wedderburn, Victoria